Boronia falcifolia, commonly known as the wallum boronia, is a plant in the citrus family, Rutaceae and is endemic to near-coastal areas of eastern Australia. It is a shrub with only a few stems, usually three-part leaves and bright pink, four-petalled flowers.

Description
The leaflets are more or less circular in cross section, usually curved and the end leaflet is similar in size and shape to the side leaflets. The eight stamens are slightly hairy.

Taxonomy and naming
Boronia falcifolia was first formally described in 1837 by Stephan Endlicher from an unpublished manuscript of Allan Cunningham and the description was published in Enumeratio plantarum quas in Novae Hollandiae ora austro-occidentali ad fluvium Cygnorum et in sinu Regis Georgii collegit Carolus Liber Baro de Hügel. Cunningham's handwriting was difficult to read and Endlicher transcribed the name as Boronia paleifolia. George Bentham noted the error in Flora Australiensis and changed the name to B. falcifolia. The specific epithet (falcifolia) is derived from the Latin words falx meaning "sickle" or "scythe" and folia meaning "leaves", referring to the curved leaflets of this boronia.

Distribution and habitat
Wallum boronia grows in wallum and heath in deep, sandy soil and sometimes in woodland. It is found in near-coastal area between Littabella National Park in Queensland and Myall Lakes National Park in New South Wales.

References

falcifolia
Flora of New South Wales
Flora of Queensland
Plants described in 1837
Taxa named by Stephan Endlicher